William Robert Luxton (born 1940) is a Falkland Islander farmer and politician who served as a Member of the Legislative Assembly for the Camp constituency from the 2009 general election until his resignation in 2011. Luxton was also a Member of the Legislative Council from 1989 to 2001, and served on the Executive Council of the Falkland Islands in the 1980s.

Luxton was born in the Falkland Islands and educated in the United Kingdom before moving back to the islands to manage his family's farm at Chartres. In 1982 Argentina invaded and occupied the Falklands for 74 days during which time Luxton was identified by the Argentine military junta as a potential troublemaker. Along with his wife, Patricia, and their children, Luxton was deported to the UK where he became notable for giving numerous interviews about his experiences with the Argentine military. Luxton and his family returned to the islands at the end of the Falklands War.

Luxton's portfolios in the Falkland Islands Government included Civil Aviation, Development Corporation, Aquaculture and Rural Development. Luxton is noted for his strong criticism of Argentina's policy on the Falkland Islands. Luxton resigned from the Legislative Assembly in 2011 due to his prologued absence from the Falklands, which was increasing the workload on other MLAs. He was replaced by Ian Hansen in an uncontested by-election.

References

1940 births
Living people
People deported from Argentina
Falkland Islands farmers
Falkland Islands Councillors 1989–1993
Falkland Islands Councillors 1993–1997
Falkland Islands Councillors 1997–2001
Falkland Islands MLAs 2009–2013